Johan Forssell may refer to:
Johan Forssell (politician, born 1855) (1855–1914), Swedish politician
Johan Forssell (politician, born 1979) (born 1979), Swedish politician